Bishop Bunyan Joseph (20 August 1894 – 25 October 1986) was the first and only elected Bishop - in - Anantapur-Kurnool Diocese who was consecrated on 27 September 1947 and was among the 15 inaugural Bishops when the Church of South India was inaugurated at the CSI-St. George's Cathedral, Chennai.  He was presented for consecration by The Venerable F. F. Gladstone and Canon T. Sithers. to the Presiding Bishop Cherakarottu Korula Jacob, who as the first Moderator, consecrated Bunyan Joseph.

Bunyan Joseph began ministering since the 1920s in parts of Andhra Pradesh and in line with the Indian ethos, he made use of the Tanpura, presenting the Gospel in Telugu language through a Hymn.  There are 7 hymns composed by Bunyan Joseph which have been included in the Christian Hymnal in Telugu language.  As observed by the Christian Artist P. Solomon Raj, the Hymnal has been of high literary standard consisting of hymns in Telugu set in music patterns of Carnatic music and Hindustani classical music.  The Missiologist Roger E. Hedlund notes that together with the Bible, the Hymnal has also gained usage equally with the Bible to both the literate and the illiterate.  The Old Testament Scholar, G. Babu Rao reiterates the significance of the hymn in making a plain listener understand the message of the Gospel.  Though it may outwardly seem nothing, the inherent technique adopted in composing such a hymn required much understanding of the scriptures and the context.  An insight into the spiritual formation of Bunyan Joseph brings forth facets of sound theological grounding at both the SPG Theological College in Madras (Tamil Nadu) under Oxbridge Scholars and later at the Divinity School at Dornakal (Telangana), under the able bishopric of Vedanayagam Samuel Azariah.

Life and times
Bunyan Joseph was an Anglican Priest of the Diocese of Dornakal under the bishopric of Vedanayagam Samuel Azariah and it was here that Bunyan Joseph became a Deacon and Presbyter in 1923 and 1924 respectively.  He composed Hymns in Telugu language and prior to becoming the Bishop, he was a Theological Tutor at the Divinity Schools in Dornakal and Giddalur and had already become a Canon.

in Madras
A couple of days' prior to 27 September 1947, the award-winning photographer Mark Kaufman of Life (magazine) undertook a photo shoot of few personalities at Madras that included Joseph Bunyan.  It was J. S. M. Hooper, then General Secretary of the Bible Society of India who preached the inaugural sermon at the cathedral.  It is said that the cathedral and its surroundings were packed with nearly 5,000 people that day.  There were a total of 15 Bishops who were consecrated, among them 9 were first time Bishops,
Bunyan Joseph, Bishop - in - Anantapur-Kurnool,
Frank Whittaker, Bishop - in - Medak,
Hospet Sumitra, Bishop - in - Cuddapah
Premaka Gurushantha, Bishop - in - Mysore,
T. G. Stuart Smith, Bishop - in - North Travancore, Cochin and Malabar, 
Arnold Legg, Bishop - in - South Travancore, 
Edgar Bentley Thorp, Bishop - in - Trichy-Tanjore
James Edward Lesslie Newbigin, Bishop - in - Madura and Ramnad,
Sabapathy Kulendran, Bishop - in - Jaffna,

The remaining 6 were already Bishops in their erstwhile dioceses until their integration into the union,
Anthony Blacker Elliott, Bishop - in - Dornakal,
Yeddy Muthyalu, Bishop - in - Krishna-Godavari, and 
Cherakarottu Korula Jacob, Bishop - in - Cochin and Malabar,
Arthur Michael Hollis, Bishop - in - Madras,
George Theodore Selwyn, Bishop - in - Tirunelveli,
Herbert Pakenham-Walsh (Diocese unassigned).

in Nandyal
The bishopric to which Bunyan Joseph was appointed was already mired in a problem of dependency and the entire Church union did not go well with the congregations who were ignorant about it and refused to join the union.  The bishopric of Bunyan Joseph was short lived and he had to relinquish the Cathedra on 2 August 1949 due to manifold reasons which is best known as the Nandyal Problem.  It was during his oversight of the ecclesiastical jurisdiction that brought him in interaction with B. E. Devaraj and Emani Sambayya.

A couple of decades later, Constance M. Millington took up Nandyal Problem as her doctoral dissertation at the University of Leeds in 1990.  Much later, S. J. Sampath Kumar, a researcher at the Sri Krishnadevaraya University, took up research on the history of the Rayalaseema diocese in 2002 and had also covered the life and times of Bunyan Joseph.

In retrospect, L. W. Brown, writing in The Churchman in 1951 about the initial three years' of the formation of the Church of South India, between the two biennial Church of South India Synods, highlighted the issues in Anantapur-Kurnool Diocese, with special reference to the bishopric of Joseph Bunyan.  

Finally in 1952, after more than two years of confrontation with the Church of South India, Bishop Bunyan Joseph came in full communion with it.  Constance M. Millington writes,

in Secunderabad
After Bunyan Joseph returned to the fold of the CSI in 1952, Arthur Michael Hollis, then Moderator, invited him to be Assistant Bishop - in - Madras.  Bunyan Joseph chose to proceed to Secunderabad where Frank Whittaker, then Bishop - in - Medak accommodated him in Medak Diocese made him as Assistant Bishop. Bunyan Joseph also served as Presbyter during the period 1956-1957 and 1960-1961 at the CSI-Church of St. John the Baptist in Secunderabad.  Rajaiah David Paul recorded that Bunyan Joseph retired in August 1959 after attaining superannuation.  However, he also recorded that it was only in October 1963 that he finally retired from active service of the Church.

Hymn compositions and writings

Writings
During the 1970s, the Board of Theological Education of the Senate of Serampore College, then in Bangalore under the stewardship of Hunter P. Mabry, H. S. Wilson, and Zaihmingthanga planned to prepare a comprehensive bibliography of original Christian writings in India in vernacular languages. Subsequently, Ravela Joseph was appointed in the 1980s to take up the task of gathering material from as many sources as possible across the Telugu-speaking states.  The search for such vernacular Christian writings and compositions from institutions of the Catholic, Protestant, the New and Indigenous Churches and individual authors and composers gathered steam and finally concluded in the 1990s by which time Suneel Bhanu also assisted in the initiative.  The Bibliography of Original Christian Writings in India in Telugu was published in 1993 and includes the following two writings by Bunyan Joseph,

Hymn compositions
As a Hymn writer, Bunyan Joseph composed many hymns and 7 of them find place in the Christian Hymnal in Telugu with the corresponding hymn numbers.

Legacy and reminisce

It was said of Bunyan Joseph as being a bullock-cart Evangelist who tended the congregations not only through the word, but through deed and has been the inspiration behind Joshua Vision India.  Scholastic and Collegiate level institutions in Nandyal supervised by the Nandyal Diocese have been named after Bunyan Joseph, namely, 
 Bishop Bunyan Joseph School,
 Bishop Bunyan Joseph SPG Junior College,

Constance M. Millington, as part of her research, had visited Bunyan Joseph in the 1980s who by that time was in his nineties in Secunderabad and reminisces,

References

Further reading
 
 
 
 
 
 
 
 
 
 
 
 
 
 

Senate of Serampore College (University) alumni
Church of South India
Church of South India clergy
Indian Christians
1894 births
1986 deaths
Indian lyricists
Telugu-language lyricists
Telugu writers
20th-century Indian writers
20th-century Indian male writers